Sofía Cairo (born 8 October 2002) is an Argentinian field hockey player.

Hockey career 
In 2021, Cairo was called into the senior national women's team.

References

Argentine female field hockey players
Living people
2002 births
Field hockey players from Buenos Aires
Competitors at the 2022 South American Games
South American Games silver medalists for Argentina
South American Games medalists in field hockey
21st-century Argentine women